Gabrielle Davis (born ca.1941), Sheriff of Canterbury  2009–2010, is a former Conservative councillor for Canterbury City Council. She is notable for volunteering to head the "defence of our heritage" movement against a vote by Canterbury City Council Executive Committee on 21 January 2010 to close Herne Bay Museum and Gallery and other repositories of local heritage for the sake of saving £112,600 per year.

Background
She was born in about 1941, in Canterbury and lived in Herne Bay, attending La Sainte Union Convent School which was run by the Sisters of La Sainte Union des Sacrés-Coeurs, and is now closed. She was later a journalist writing features in London. She worked for a number of women's magazines published by IPC (Woman's Day, Woman's Realm, Woman's Weekly...).  She is now again living in Herne Bay, writes the Beltinge column for Herne Bay Gazette and supports causes concerning pets and wildlife.  She was fund-raising officer for six years at Cats Protection in Canterbury, and is now Trustee for Animals Worldwide.

Duties
She was elected a member of Canterbury City Council in 2003 and Sheriff of Canterbury in May 2009 and was a ward member for Reculver. Until May 2010 she was the latest in the line of Sheriffs of Canterbury which goes back to 1461 CE. In past centuries the post involved tax-collecting and police work, but since 1974 the Sheriff has been relieved of those duties and now represents the City at functions and other civic duties. The postholder is elected at the annual Council meeting in May, for one year. In May 2010 she was succeeded as Sheriff of Canterbury by Councillor Sally Pickersgill.

Defence of our heritage

In October 2009 Canterbury City Council said it had to save £3.5m for budgeting purposes.
 The Executive Committee made its final recommendation to close the museum on 21 January 2010; the final vote to be taken on 18 February 2010. Councillor Davis is a founder-member of Herne Bay Improvement and Conservation Trust, and some of her colleagues on the Trust are members of Herne Bay Historical Society, which has charge of most of the collections at Herne Bay Museum. In response to the Council vote to close the museum, she volunteered to "head defence of our heritage", in spite of the fact that the vote for closure was made by her Conservative colleagues on the Council.

References

External links
Canterbury City Council Online: Gabrielle Davis page
Canterbury City Council Online: The office of sheriff
Canterbury City Council Online: Agenda for Exec Committee 21 Jan 2010 (includes link to audio recording of meeting)

People from Herne Bay, Kent
Sheriffs of Canterbury
Living people
Year of birth missing (living people)